The Thames Aerodrome serves the town of Thames, in the Waikato region of the North Island of New Zealand. It is 3 km south of the town of Thames. The Aerodrome is named in honour of former Thames resident Air Chief Marshal Sir Keith Park, Commander of 11 Group Fighter Command during the Battle of Britain.

See also

 List of airports in New Zealand
 List of airlines of New Zealand
 Transport in New Zealand

Sources
AIP New Zealand Aerodrome Chart (PDF)

References

Airports in New Zealand
Thames-Coromandel District
Transport buildings and structures in Waikato